Yizhuang T1 Line is a  tram line with 15 stations. It is part of Beijing Subway system. It runs from  station in Daxing District to  station in Tongzhou District. The line opened on December 31, 2020. Laoguanli station will open in 2024.

Stations (Southwest to Northeast)

History

Future Development
A branch line of Yizhuang T1 line is planned for the future.

References

Transport in Beijing